The 2014 Pulitzer Prizes were awarded by the Pulitzer Prize Board for work during the 2013 calendar year.  The deadline for entries was January 25, 2014. Prize winners and nominated finalists were announced on April 14, 2014.

The Washington Post and The Guardian US shared the Pulitzer Prize for Public Service, often considered the top prize for journalism.  The two papers were honored for their coverage of the disclosures about surveillance done by the US National Security Agency.  Edward Snowden, who leaked security documents to the two newspapers, said the award was "vindication for everyone who believes that the public has a role in government."  Other journalism honored included the Boston Globes coverage of the Boston Marathon bombings, Chris Hamby for investigative reporting, and Eli Saslow for explanatory reporting.

The Goldfinch by Donna Tartt won the Pulitzer Prize for Fiction.  The judges described the novel, which took Tartt 11 years to write, as "a beautifully written coming-of-age novel with exquisitely drawn characters".  In addition to the award itself, Tartt received a $100,000 cash prize.  She said she was "surprised" and "very happy" to receive the award, her first major literary prize.  Overall, the novel has drawn "mixed reviews" from literary critics.  Other contenders for the fiction prize included  The Son by Philipp Meyer and The Woman Who Lost Her Soul by Bob Shacochis.  Vijay Seshadri won the Pulitzer Prize for Poetry for his collection 3 Sections.  Other literary winners included The Internal Enemy by Alan Taylor, Toms River: A Story of Science and Salvation by Dan Fagin, and Megan Marshall's biography of Margaret Fuller.

Prizes
There were 20 prizes awarded in 21 categories – no award in the category Feature Writing.

Journalism

Letters, Drama, and Music

Special Citation 
Not awarded in 2014.

References

Pulitzer Prizes by year
Pulitzer Prize
Pulitzer
Pulitzer Prize
Pulitzer
April 2014 events in the United States